This article shows C.S. Marítimo's player statistics and all matches that the club played during the 2017–18 season.

Players

Current squad
As of 9 January 2018.

Out on loan

Competitions

Primeira Liga

League table

Results by round

Results summary

Matches

Taça de Portugal

Third round

Fourth round

Round of 16

Taça da Liga

Second Qualifying Round

Group stage

UEFA Europa League

Third Qualifying Round

Play-off Round

References

C.S. Marítimo seasons
Marítimo
Marítimo